Lidiya Oleksiivna Belozyorova (31 March 1945 – 15 February 2022) was a Ukrainian actress of stage and screen. Beloziorova performed in more than 100 drama and musical performances at Musical-Dramatic Theatre Mykola Sadovskiy. She was made a People's Artist of Ukraine, received the title of Merited Artist of Ukraine and earned the Order of Princess Olga, 3rd class.

Biography
On 31 March 1945, Belozyorova was born in Kherson under the maiden name of Lidiia Vakula. In 1963, she began working as an artist at the Mykola Kulish Theatre. Belozyorova was a 1968 graduate of the Kyiv National I. K. Karpenko-Kary Theatre, Cinema and Television University.

She had roles in cinema: she played the role of Paraska in the 1971 film , portrayed the cossack's wife in the 1972 Boris Ivchenko film The Lost Letter and Valeria in the 1975  film Simple Cares. Belozyorova had roles in the second, third, fourth, fifth and sixth series of the television programme Muhtar's Return in 2005 and 2007.

Belozyorova projected a strong voice that enabled her to combine acting with signing. She normally portrayed heroines of various ages, temperaments, characters and nationalities.

Belozyorova died on 15 February 2022 in Vinnytsia. On the afternoon of 17 February, a remembrance service was held for Beloziorova at Musical-Dramatic Theatre Mykola Sadovskiy in Vinnytsia, attended by members of the public.

Awards
In 1993, she was made a People's Artist of Ukraine and had also received the title of Merited Artist of Ukraine. Belozyorova was named a laureate of the Nikolai Zarudny Prize in 2001 or 2002 "for theatrical work". In 2003, she received the Order of Princess Olga, 3rd class.

References

External links
 

1945 births
2022 deaths
Actors from Kherson
Kyiv National I. K. Karpenko-Kary Theatre, Cinema and Television University alumni
20th-century Ukrainian actresses
21st-century Ukrainian actresses
Ukrainian stage actresses
Ukrainian film actresses
Ukrainian television actresses
Recipients of the title of People's Artists of Ukraine
Recipients of the title of Merited Artist of Ukraine
Recipients of the Order of Princess Olga, 3rd class